The Regional Agreement on Access to Information, Public Participation and Justice in Environmental Matters in Latin America and the Caribbean, better known as the Escazú Agreement, is an international treaty signed by 25 Latin American and Caribbean nations concerning the rights of access to information about the environment, public participation in environmental decision-making, environmental justice, and a healthy and sustainable environment for current and future generations. The agreement is open to 33 countries in Latin America and the Caribbean. Of the 25 signatories, it has been ratified by fourteen: Antigua and Barbuda, Argentina, Bolivia, Chile, Colombia, Ecuador, Guyana, Mexico, Nicaragua, Panama, Saint Vincent and the Grenadines, Saint Kitts and Nevis, Saint Lucia, and Uruguay.

The agreement originated at the 2012 United Nations Conference on Sustainable Development and is the only binding treaty to be adopted as a result of the conference. With the UN's Economic Commission for Latin America and the Caribbean (ECLAC) acting as the technical secretariat for the process, it was drafted between 2015 and 2018 and adopted in Escazú, Costa Rica, on 4 March 2018. The agreement was signed on 27 September 2018 and remained open for signature until 26 September 2020. Eleven ratifications were required for the agreement to enter into force, which was achieved on 22 January 2021 with the accession of Mexico and Argentina. The agreement entered into force on 22 April 2021.

The Escazú Agreement is the first international treaty in Latin America and the Caribbean concerning the environment, and the first in the world to include provisions on the rights of environmental defenders. The agreement strengthens the links between human rights and environmental protection by imposing requirements upon member states concerning the rights of environmental defenders. It aims to provide full public access to environmental information, environmental decision-making, and legal protection and recourse concerning environmental matters. It also recognizes the right of current and future generations to a healthy environment and sustainable development.

Parties and signatories

Ratification delays 
Several commentators have expressed doubt that Brazil will ratify the treaty under Jair Bolsonaro, whose government has not been supportive of environmental or human rights mechanisms. Colombia has finally ratified the agreement in July 2022. Colombia ranks among the top countries in the region for death of environmental defenders.

Despite being one of the leading countries in the negotiation process for this agreement, Chile decided not to sign the Escazú Agreement in a last minute decision. Few months later, President Sebastián Piñera rejected the entire agreement, apparently due to objections made by the Ministry of Foreign Affairs regarding a potential request from Bolivia to get sovereign access to the Pacific Ocean and the pressure of business leaders. After Piñera left office in March 2022, his successor Gabriel Boric decided to sign the Escazú Agreement, being the first bill presented by his government to the National Congress. Chile ratified the agreement in June 2022.

Costa Rica refused to ratify the agreement after Rodrigo Chaves Robles came to power.

Youth Champion 
On 2020, for the agreement's second anniversary,  The Access Initiative (TAI), the United Nations Economic Commission for Latin America and the Caribbean (UN ECLAC) and the Government of Costa Rica selected 5 new youth champions, succeeding David R. Boyd, from amongst young activists around Latin America and the Caribbean:

References

2018 in the environment
Environmental treaties
United Nations treaties
Treaties concluded in 2018